Javier Lozano Alarcón (born November 21, 1962) is a Mexican politician who served Secretary of Labor in the cabinet of President Felipe Calderón. He was elected as a senator to the LXII Legislature of the Mexican Congress, representing Puebla. He then resigned from the PAN and worked in the campaign of presidential candidate José Antonio Meade Kuribreña.

He was telecoms consultant.
Lozano has served as president of the Federal Telecommunications Commission (COFETEL).

In 2007, Chinese-Mexican businessman Zhenli Ye Gon, who was under investigation for the largest drug-related cash seizure in history, accused Lozano Alarcón of forcing him to stash at least $150 million in illicit campaign funds within his Mexico City mansion. Lozano Alarcón denied the allegations.

References

Living people
1962 births
Members of the Senate of the Republic (Mexico)
National Action Party (Mexico) politicians
Mexican Secretaries of Labor
21st-century Mexican politicians
Politicians from Puebla
People from Puebla (city)
Escuela Libre de Derecho alumni
Academic staff of Escuela Libre de Derecho
Senators of the LXII and LXIII Legislatures of Mexico